The York class was the second and final class of heavy cruisers built for the Royal Navy under the terms of the 1922 Washington Naval Treaty. They were essentially a reduced version of the preceding , scaled down to enable more cruisers to be built from the limited defence budgets of the late 1920s.

Exeter differed in appearance from York because of late changes in her design. The remaining ships were delayed due to budget cuts, and then following the London Naval Treaty of 1930 the Royal Navy decided its cruiser needs were best met by building a greater number of yet smaller cruisers with 6–in guns.

While both ships served extensively in the first few years of the Second World War, it was Exeter that had the more notable career. Exeter took part in the Battle of the River Plate against the German raider , and was badly damaged, though later she was repaired and modernized.  She escorted a convoy to the Pacific in late 1941, and was again heavily damaged in the Battle of the Java Sea, then caught and overwhelmed a few days later by four Japanese heavy cruisers. York was sunk in Suda Bay, Crete, by Italian MT boats in 1941, and was raised in 1952 and towed away to be scrapped in Italy.

Design
From 1925 the Royal Navy planned a "Class B" cruiser (as against the 10,000-ton cruisers of Class A, such as the Counties.)

The new design was to have a displacement of 8,500 tons, as opposed to the 10,000 tons of the County class. This weight saving was mainly to be accomplished by reducing the armament to six 8-in guns (as opposed to the 8 guns on the County class), and also by using a new Mark II mounting for the guns. Otherwise the new ships were to share all the main features of the preceding class.

Propulsion
Their engines were identical - four boilers in two boiler rooms providing steam for four Parsons geared turbines, generating 80,000 shaft horsepower.

Protection
The transmitting station was also covered by 1-inch armour. To shorten the belt length, the amidship magazine found on the Counties was removed (reduced armament required less magazine space anyway). This armour scheme was generally equivalent to that of the County class, though thicker over the machinery spaces.

Armament
The six  Mark VIII guns were mounted in three turrets. York used the Mark II mounting, which was intended to be 20 tons lighter than the Mark I mounting used on the earlier County-class ships; however, in fact it turned out to be heavier. The Mark II mounting was capable of firing at up to 80 degrees elevation for anti-aircraft barrage fire. However, this feature, which was also shared with the Mark I mounting, turned out to produce more mechanical headaches than were justified by its very marginal military utility. Exeter used a modified Mark II* mounting, limited to 50 degrees elevation.

The secondary armament consisted of four  QF Mark V guns and two 2-pounder guns. Two triple  torpedo tubes were carried. This was similar to the County class, with the exception that the Yorks carried two fewer torpedo tubes, because of the narrower beam.

Appearance
As a result of the magazine changes, and to keep the funnels distant from the bridge, only two funnels were required; the forward boiler room uptakes trunked up into a large fore-funnel. This was raked in York to clear the flue gases from the bridge, but was straight in Exeter owing to an altered bridge design and more extensive trunking. To maintain homogeneity of appearance, York stepped raked masts and Exeter vertical ones. York had a tall "platform" style bridge as seen in the Counties, which was somewhat distant from 'B' turret. This was because it had been intended to fit a catapult and floatplane to the roof of the turret, which needed clearance distance and required a tall bridge to provide forward view. The roof of the turret, however, was not sufficiently strong to carry this catapult and it was never fitted.

York eventually received a rotating catapult amidships behind the funnels, and Exeter had a fixed pair in the same location, firing forwards and angled out from the centreline. A crane for recovery was located to starboard and one aircraft could be carried on York, initially a Fairey Seafox (two on Exeter) and later, on Exeter, two Supermarine Walrus.

Compared to the Counties, the Yorks saved 1,750 tons in net weight, but the reductions in cost of £250,000 and manpower of 50 was something of an uneconomical saving.

Ships

References

Bibliography

 
 

 
 Marriott, Leo. Treaty Cruisers: The first international warship building competition. Pen & Sword Maritime, Barnsley, 2005.

External links

Cruiser classes
History of York
Ship classes of the Royal Navy